George O. Wood (September 1, 1941 – January 12, 2022) was an American Pentecostal minister. He served in executive leadership of the U.S. Assemblies of God for 24 years in the roles of general secretary and general superintendent. From 2007 until 2017, he served as General Superintendent of the General Council of the Assemblies of God in the United States of America (AG) and had been Chairman of the World Assemblies of God Fellowship, the largest Pentecostal denomination in the world, since 2008. He previously served as General Secretary of the AG from 1993 to 2007.

Wood served as Director of Spiritual Life and Student Life at Evangel University from 1965-71, Pastor of Newport Mesa Christian Center, now Mesa Church in Costa Mesa, California, for 17 years; and Assistant Superintendent of the Southern California Ministry Network from 1988-93. He held doctorates in both theology and law.

Personal life and death
Wood was born to missionaries in China on September 1, 1941. He received a B.A. from Evangel University, a J.D. from Western State University College of Law in Fullerton, California, and a Ph.D. degree in pastoral theology from Fuller Theological Seminary in Pasadena, California. He died from cancer on January 12, 2022, at the age of 80.

Ministry
For 17 years he pastored Newport Mesa Christian Center in Costa Mesa, California. From 1965 until 1971, he was director of Spiritual Life and Student Life at Evangel University in Springfield, Missouri. 

In 1988 until 1993, he was Assistant Superintendent of the Southern California District of the Assemblies of God (1988–93). From 1993 until 2007, he served as General Secretary of the General Council of the Assemblies of God in the United States of America (AG). From 2007 until 2017, he served as General Superintendent of the AG. In 2008, he became the Chairman of the World Assemblies of God Fellowship.

Publications
 1984 The Successful Life 
 1986 Living Fully 
 1998 A Psalm in Your Heart: Psalms 1-75 
 1999 A Psalm In Your Heart, Volume 2: Psalms 76-150 
 2008 Trusting God 
 2009 Living in the Spirit 
 2009 Jesus and You 
 2012 Acts of the Holy Spirit

References

External links
 Website
 Weekly podcast

1941 births
2022 deaths
American Assemblies of God pastors
Evangel University alumni
Western State University College of Law alumni
Fuller Theological Seminary alumni
 deaths from cancer in Missouri